Angor is a district of Surxondaryo Region in Uzbekistan. The capital lies at the town Angor.

The district consists of 12 urban-type settlements (Angor, Tallimaron, Xomkon, Qorasuv, Yangiobod, Talloshqon, Gilambob, Zartepa, Yangi turmush, Angor (yangi), Kayran, Novshahar) and 7 rural communities.

References 

Districts of Uzbekistan
Surxondaryo Region